"Get Down and Get with It" is a song by American R&B singer-songwriter Bobby Marchan, first released as "Get Down with It" as the B-Side to his 1964 single "Half a Mind". In 1967, American singer Little Richard would record his own version, which was released as a single. In 1971, the British rock band Slade recorded a version of the song as "Get Down and Get with It", based on Little Richard's version, which gave the band their first UK chart hit.

Slade version

"Get Down and Get with It" was later covered by British rock band Slade. Released in 1971, the single was the band's first UK chart entry, reaching No. 16 and remaining in the charts for fourteen weeks. Slade's version was produced by Chas Chandler and would later appear on the band's 1973 compilation album Sladest.

Background
After the commercial failure of their 1970 album Play It Loud, Slade and their manager Chas Chandler began considering the band's next career move. They decided that the best way to make a commercial breakthrough would be to capture the band's strong reputation as a live act onto record. The chosen song was "Get Down and Get with It", which the band frequently played live to a great response. Released in May 1971, the song successfully broke the band into the UK and Europe. It reached No. 16 in the UK and would be the first of seventeen consecutive Top 20 hits for the band, which included six number ones.

Prior to recording the song in the studio, the band had established "Get Down and Get with It" as a popular number in their live-set, based on Little Richard's version. In the band's 1984 biography Feel the Noize!, Holder recalled: "The first time we heard that was at the Connaught in Wolverhampton and whenever the DJ used to play it, it went down a storm. We started doing it and the skinheads used to love that bit at the finish where you put your hands in the air and take your boots off and all that."

Impressed by the general audience reception of the song, Chandler suggested recording the song as a single. The band entered Olympic Studios in Barnes to record it and Chandler told the band: "Just play it like you do on-stage. Blast it out like it's live, and pretend that there's an audience in there with you." Successfully recorded in a single take, the band included foot-stomping and hand-clapping in the recording to give the song a live feel.

The single was released twice during 1971; firstly on 21 May as "Get Down and Get with It" with writing credit for the song being given to the band and Little Richard. The band had believed the song to have been written by Little Richard. However, as the song started to climb the charts, publishers on behalf of Marchan soon got involved. The single was hurriedly re-issued as "Get Down with It" and correctly changed the writing credit to Marchan. In his 1999 biography Who's Crazee Now?, Holder recalled: "The record company sorted out the lawsuit, but we learnt to be more careful in future."

In 1990, Kiss AMC sampled a segment of the Slade Alive! version of the song for their single "My Docs", which featured an appearance from Holder in the music video. The song reached No. 66 in the UK.

Release
"Get Down and Get with It" was released on 7" vinyl by Polydor Records in the UK, Ireland, across Europe, Scandinavia, Australia, New Zealand, Mexico, Brazil and Argentina. In America, it was released by Cotillion. The B-sides, "Do You Want Me" and "Gospel According to Rasputin", would appear on certain editions of the band's 1972 European compilation Coz I Luv You. They were also included on the 2007 compilation B-Sides. For the UK and Ireland release, both B-sides were included on the single, while in most European countries, only "Gospel According to Rasputin" was included.

Promotion
A music video was filmed to promote the single, although it received few airings at the time. The black-and-white video was filmed by Caravelle. It featured Slade in the back of an open-roofed American car on the flyover roads in Central London. Arriving at a power station, the band climb onto the roof, dance and walk around, then return to the car and drive off. In a 1973 interview with Music Star, guitarist Dave Hill recalled the making of the song's video in relation to his fear of heights: "I was wearing a silver suit so they decided to film me walking along an overhead ledge as though I was a spaceman who'd just landed. It was very high up and I suddenly looked down at the ground. That was a mistake because I just froze. I had this terror of falling and I just froze completely, like a cat does when it gets stuck up a tree."

In the UK, the band performed the song on the music show Top of the Pops and The Roger Whittaker Show. In Belgium, they performed it on the TV show Popshop. In 1972, the band performed the song on 2Gs and the Pop People. A live performance of the song, recorded at the band's concert in Sydney, Australia, in 1973, was filmed for the Australian music TV show GTK.

Critical reception
Upon release, Record Mirror said: "It's a scream-up of an adaption of a Little Richard rocker and there's a positive air of desperation as Noddy Holder builds up the excitement". Bradford Telegraph noted Holder's "cut-throat razor" vocals and described the song as "pier-end entertainment brought up to date". In a retrospective song review by AllMusic, Dave Thompson said: "The [song] perfectly encapsulates the madness of a period Slade show, and the band's only complaint was that it wasn't half as heavy as it should have been. No matter, the stamping and clapping accompaniment became a Slade trademark regardless, while the record's overall aura of unrestrained power was simply too much for many radio DJs."

Track listing
7" Single (UK only)
"Get Down and Get with It" - 4:12
"Do You Want Me" - 4:30
"Gospel According to Rasputin" - 4:23

7" Single (Europe/Argentina release)
"Get Down and Get with It" - 4:12
"Gospel According to Rasputin" - 4:23

7" Single (US release)
"Get Down and Get with It" - 3:25
"Do You Want Me" - 4:30

7" Single (US promo)
"Get Down and Get with It" - 3:25
"Get Down and Get with It" - 3:25

7" Single (French release)
"Get Down and Get with It" - 4:12
"Know Who You Are" - 2:50

7" Single (Mexican release)
"Get Down and Get with It" - 4:12
"Know Who You Are" - 2:50
"I Remember" - 2:55

7" Single (Australian 1972 EP)
"Get Down and Get with It" - 4:12
"Look Wot You Dun" - 2:54
"Coz I Luv You" - 3:24
"Take Me Bak 'Ome" - 3:13

7" Single (Brazilian 1972 EP)
"Get Down and Get with It" - 4:12
"Mama Weer All Crazee Now" - 3:45
"Cum On Feel the Noize" - 4:24
"Gudbuy T'Jane" - 3:33

Chart performance

Personnel
Slade
Noddy Holder - lead vocals, rhythm guitar
Dave Hill - lead guitar, backing vocals
Jim Lea - bass, backing vocals
Don Powell - drums

Additional personnel
Chas Chandler - producer
Zoot Money - piano

References

1971 singles
Slade songs
Song recordings produced by Chas Chandler
1964 songs
Polydor Records singles
Little Richard songs